Architectonica is a genus of sea snails in the family Architectonicidae.

Species
According to the World Register of Marine Species, the following species are included in the genus Architectonica:
 Architectonica arcana Bieler, 1993
 Architectonica consobrina Bieler, 1993
 Architectonica grandiosa Iredale, 1931
 Architectonica gualtierii Bieler, 1993
 Architectonica karsteni Rutsch, 1934
 Architectonica laevigata (Lamarck)
 Architectonica maculata (Link, 1807)
 Architectonica maxima (Philippi, 1849)
 Architectonica modesta (Philippi, 1848)
 Architectonica nobilis Röding, 1798 - common sundial
 Architectonica perdix (Hinds, 1844)
 Architectonica perspectiva (Linnaeus, 1758)
 Architectonica proestleri Alf & Kreipl, 2001
 Architectonica purpurata (Hinds, 1844)
 Architectonica stellata (Philippi, 1849)
 Architectonica taylori (Hanley, 1862)
 Architectonica trochlearis (Hinds, 1844)

The Indo-Pacific Molluscan Database also includes the following names in current use 
 Architectonica bairdii (Sowerby, 1866)
 Architectonica biangulatum (Gray, 1826)
 Architectonica impressum (Nevill, 1869)
 Architectonica (maxima-group) Bieler, 1993
 Architectonica (perspectiva-group) Bieler, 1993
 Architectonica (Adelphotectonica) kuroharai(Kuroda & Habe in Habe, 1961-a)

Species in the genus Architectonica include:

 Architectonica acuta
 Architectonica acutissima
 Architectonica amoena
 Architectonica bellistriata
 Architectonica briarti
 Architectonica carocollata
 Architectonica cingulatum
 Architectonica cognata
 Architectonica cyclostomum
 Architectonica euprepes
 Architectonica fimbiaea
 Architectonica fuliginosum
 Architectonica geminicostata
 Architectonica guppyi
 Architectonica krebsii
 Architectonica kurodae
 Architectonica lutea
 Architectonica marwicki
 Architectonica mediterraneum
 Architectonica meekana
 Architectonica melajoensis
 Architectonica millegranum
 Architectonica millegranum subcanaliculatum
 Architectonica neerlandica
 Architectonica peracuta (Dall, 1889)
 Architectonica planorbis
 Architectonica planulata
 Architectonica quadriseriata
 Architectonica quinquesulcata
 Architectonica regia
 Architectonica scrobiculata
 Architectonica simplex
 Architectonica sindermanni
 Architectonica uruguaya
 Architectonica voragiformis

Species brought into synonymy
 Architectonica gothica Röding, 1798: synonym of Heliacus (Grandeliacus) stramineus (Gmelin, 1791)
 Architectonica granulata (Lamarck, 1816): synonym of Architectonica nobilis Röding, 1798
 Architectonica kuroharai Kuroda & Habe in Habe, 1961: synonym of Adelphotectonica kuroharai (Kuroda & Habe in Habe, 1961)
 Architectonica nomotoi Kosuge, 1979: synonym of Adelphotectonica nomotoi (Kosuge, 1979)
 Architectonica offlexa Iredale, 1931: synonym of Adelphotectonica reevei (Hanley, 1862)
 Architectonica pentacyclota Azuma, 1973: synonym of Adelphotectonica kuroharai (Kuroda & Habe in Habe, 1961)
 Architectonica picta (Philippi, 1849): synonym of Architectonica maculata (Link, 1807)
 Architectonica placentalis (Hinds, 1844): synonym of Discotectonica placentalis (Hinds, 1844)
 † Architectonica pseudoperspectiva (Brocchi, 1814): synonym of † Discotectonica pseudoperspective (Brocchi, 1814)
 Architectonica radialis Dall, 1908: synonym of Solatisonax radialis (Dall, 1908)
 Architectonica radiata Röding, 1798: synonym of Psilaxis radiatus (Röding, 1798)
 Architectonica reevei (Hanley, 1862): synonym of Adelphotectonica reevei (Hanley, 1862)
 Architectonica relata Iredale, 1936: synonym of Adelphotectonica reevei (Hanley, 1862)
 Architectonica sindermanni Merrill & Boss, 1984: synonym of Adelphotectonica uruguaya (Carcelles, 1953)
 Architectonica sunderlandi Petuch, 1987: synonym of Adelphotectonica uruguaya (Carcelles, 1953)
 Architectonica valenciennesii Mörch, 1859: synonym of Architectonica nobilis Röding, 1798
 Architectonica wroblewskyi Mörch, 1875: synonym of Architectonica nobilis Röding, 1798

References

 
 ZipCodeZoo
 Powell A. W. B., New Zealand Mollusca, William Collins Publishers Ltd, Auckland, New Zealand 1979 
  Bieler R. (1993). Architectonicidae of the Indo-Pacific (Mollusca, Gastropoda). Abhandlungen des Naturwissenschaftlichen Vereins in Hamburg (NF) 30: 1-376 [15 December]. page(s): 36
 Rolán E., 2005. Malacological Fauna From The Cape Verde Archipelago. Part 1, Polyplacophora and Gastropoda.

Architectonicidae